Big Trouble in Little China (also known as John Carpenter's Big Trouble in Little China) is a 1986 American fantasy action-comedy film directed by John Carpenter, and starring Kurt Russell, Kim Cattrall, Dennis Dun and James Hong. The film tells the story of truck driver Jack Burton (Russell), who helps his friend Wang Chi (Dun) rescue Wang's green-eyed fiancée from bandits in San Francisco's Chinatown. They go into the mysterious underworld beneath Chinatown, where they face an ancient sorcerer named David Lo Pan (Hong), who requires a woman with green eyes to marry him in order to be released from a centuries-old curse.

Although the original screenplay by first-time screenwriters Gary Goldman and David Z. Weinstein was envisioned as a Western set in the 1880s, screenwriter W. D. Richter was hired to rewrite the script extensively and modernize it. The studio hired Carpenter to direct the film and rushed Big Trouble in Little China into production so that it would be released before a similarly themed Eddie Murphy film, The Golden Child, which was slated to come out around the same time. The project fulfilled Carpenter's long-standing desire to make a martial arts film.

The film was a commercial failure, grossing $11.1 million in North America, below its estimated $19 to $25 million budget. It received generally positive reviews, but left Carpenter disillusioned with Hollywood and influenced his decision to return to independent filmmaking. It gained a steady audience on home video and has become a cult classic.

Plot
Truck driver Jack Burton wins a bet with his friend Wang Chi. To make sure he follows through on payment, Jack accompanies him to the airport to pick up Wang's Chinese fiancée Miao Yin, where a Chinese-American street gang, the Lords of Death, tries to kidnap another Chinese girl. She is being met by her friend Gracie Law. After Jack intervenes, they take Miao Yin instead.

Jack and Wang track the Lords of Death to Chinatown, where they find a funeral procession that erupts into a battle between the Chang Sing and Wing Kong, two ancient Chinese warrior societies. When "The Three Storms" – Thunder, Rain, and Lightning, warriors with weather-themed powers – appear, slaughtering the Chang Sing, Jack attempts to gun his big-rig through the crowd, but runs over David Lo Pan, a man directing the Three Storms. Horrified, Jack exits his truck, but finds Lo Pan unhurt and glowing with magic. Wang hurriedly guides Jack through the alleys; they escape, but Jack's truck is stolen.

Wang takes Jack to his restaurant, where they meet with Gracie, her journalist friend Margo, Wang's friend Eddie Lee, and magician Egg Shen, a local authority on mysticism and Lo Pan. They explain to Jack (who only wants his truck back) the ancient knowledge and sorcery the Chinese brought with them to America. The group devises a plan to infiltrate a brothel, where they believe Miao Yin is held. They break in, but are interrupted by the Storms who kidnap Miao Yin, and take her to Lo Pan. 

Jack and Wang track down the front business used by Lo Pan and impersonate telephone repairmen to gain access, but are quickly subdued by Rain. After being tied up and beaten by Thunder, they meet Lo Pan – however, he now appears as a crippled old man.

Wang tells Jack that Lo Pan needs a green-eyed girl to break an ancient curse, and he intends to sacrifice Miao Yin. Centuries ago, Lo Pan was defeated in battle by Emperor Qin Shi Huang. He cursed Lo Pan with incorporeality; although he can be temporarily granted a decrepit body by supplication to the gods, he can permanently break the curse by marrying a woman with green eyes and sacrificing her. Jack and Wang's friends attempt to save them, and are also captured. 

After getting the drop on Thunder, Jack, Wang, and Eddie escape and free women kept in cells. An orangutan-like Wild-Man recaptures Gracie before she escapes. Lo Pan notes that Gracie has green eyes, too, and decides to sacrifice her while making Miao Yin his wife.

Wang and Jack regroup with the Chang Sing and Egg Shen, and enter a cavern to return to Lo Pan's headquarters. Egg pours the group a potent potion. They interrupt the wedding, and start a battle. Wang kills Rain in a sword duel, while Jack and Gracie chase Lo Pan, who has regained his corporeal form by consuming a few drops of Miao Yin's blood. Wang joins them; Lo Pan attempts to kill Jack with a throwing knife, but he catches it and kills him with a throw to his head. 

Thunder – who had been distracted with Wang – reappears, and, enraged at finding Lo Pan dead, swells up and explodes. Jack, Wang, Gracie, and Miao Yin are cornered by Lightning in a corridor, who triggers a collapse. Egg rescues them with a rope and kills Lightning by dropping a Buddha statue on him when he tries to follow. After finding Jack's truck and dealing with the remaining Wing Kong guards, the group escapes back to Wang's restaurant.

The group celebrates in the restaurant; Wang and Miao Yin prepare to marry, while Eddie pairs with Margo. Egg sets off to China. Gracie offers to join Jack, but he leaves alone. Unbeknownst to him, the Wild-Man survived the battle and has stowed away on his truck.

Cast

 Kurt Russell as Jack Burton, a cocky, wise-cracking truck driver who gets involved in an ancient battle between Good and Evil when he makes a delivery to Chinatown, San Francisco.
 Kim Cattrall as Gracie Law, a lawyer who is Jack's love interest.
 Dennis Dun as Wang Chi, Jack's best friend and restaurant owner whose fiancée is kidnapped by Lo Pan.
 James Hong as David Lo Pan, an ancient Chinese sorcerer who was cursed by Emperor Qin Shi Huang.
 Victor Wong as Egg Shen, a sorcerer and old enemy of Lo Pan who also drives a tour bus.
 Kate Burton as Margo Litzenberger, a reporter who briefly helps the team find Miao Yin.
 Donald Li as Eddie Lee, a successful businessman and Wang's friend who helps them rescue Gracie.
 Carter Wong as Thunder, an elemental master who can expand his body
 Peter Kwong as Rain, an elemental master and expert martial artist with a sword
 James Pax as Lightning, an elemental master who can shoot out bolts of lightning
 Suzee Pai as Miao Yin, Wang's fiancee, who was kidnapped by Lo Pan when she arrives in America.
 Chao-Li Chi as Uncle Chu, Wang's uncle.
 Jeff Imada as Needles, a member of a street gang called The Lords of Death.

Al Leong, Gerald Okamura and Nathan Jung appear as Wing Kong hatchet men. Lia Chang and Cary-Hiroyuki Tagawa have minor roles as Wing Kong members. Frank Ho, Conan Lee (Uncredited) and James Lew (the film's martial arts choreographer) appear as Chang Sing warriors. Noble Craig appears as "Sewer Monster".

Production

Screenplay
The first version of the screenplay was written by first-time screenwriters Gary Goldman and David Z. Weinstein. Goldman had been inspired by a new wave of martial arts films that had "all sorts of weird actions and special effects, shot against this background of Oriental mysticism and modern sensibilities". They had written a Western originally set in the 1880s with Jack Burton as a cowboy who rides into town. Goldman and Weinstein envisioned what amounts to a Weird Western, in this case, combining Chinese fantasy elements within an Old West setting. They submitted the script to TAFT Entertainment Pictures executive producers Paul Monash and Keith Barish during the summer of 1982. Monash bought their script and had them do at least one rewrite but still did not like the results. He remembers, "The problems came largely from the fact it was set in turn-of-the-century San Francisco, which affected everything—style, dialogue, action". Goldman rejected a request by 20th Century Fox for a rewrite that asked for major alterations. He was angered when the studio wanted to update it to a contemporary setting. The studio then removed the writers from the project. However, they still wanted credit for their contributions.

The studio brought in screenwriter W. D. Richter, a veteran script doctor (and director of The Adventures of Buckaroo Banzai) to extensively rewrite the script, as he felt that the Wild West and fantasy elements did not work together. The screenwriter modernized everything. Almost everything in the original script was discarded except for Lo Pan's story. Richter realized that "what it needed wasn't a rewrite but a complete overhaul. It was a dreadful screenplay. This happens often when scripts are bought and there's no intention that the original writers will stay on". Richter used Rosemary's Baby as his template, presenting "the foreground story in a familiar context – rather than San Francisco at the turn-of-the-century, which distances the audience immediately – and just have one simple remove, the world underground, you have a much better chance of making direct contact with the audience". He wrote his own draft in 10 weeks. Goldman contacted Richter and suggested that he should not work on the project. Richter told him, "I'm sorry the studio doesn't want to go forward with you guys, but my turning it down is not going to get you the job. They'll just hire someone else".

Fox wanted to deny Goldman and Weinstein writing credit, and eliminated their names from press releases. They wanted only Richter to have credit. In March 1986, the Writers Guild of America, West determined that "written by" credit would go to Goldman and Weinstein, based on the WGA screenwriting credit system which protects original writers. However, Richter did get an "adaptation by" credit for his work on the script. Director John Carpenter was disappointed that Richter did not get a proper screenwriting credit because of the ruling. Carpenter made his own additions to Richter's rewrites, which included strengthening the Gracie Law role and linking her to Chinatown, removing a few action sequences due to budgetary restrictions and eliminating material deemed offensive to Chinese Americans. The characters in the film reminded Carpenter "of the characters in Bringing Up Baby or His Girl Friday. These are very 1930s, Howard Hawks people." The rapid-fire delivery of dialogue, especially between Jack Burton and Gracie Law, is an example of what the director is referring to.

Hong Kong wuxia films, particularly Tsui Hark's Zu Warriors from the Magic Mountain (1983), also served as an influence.

Casting
Barish and Monash first offered the project to Carpenter in July 1985. He had read the Goldman/Weinstein script and deemed it "outrageously unreadable though it had many interesting elements". To compete with rival production The Golden Child’s casting of box office draw Eddie Murphy, Carpenter wanted a big star of his own and both Clint Eastwood and Jack Nicholson were considered but were busy.

The studio felt Kurt Russell was an up-and-coming star. Russell was initially not interested because he felt there were "a number of different ways to approach Jack, but I didn't know if there was a way that would be interesting enough for this movie". After talking to Carpenter and reading the script a few more times, he gained insight into the character and liked the notion of playing "a hero who has so many faults. Jack is and isn't the hero. He falls on his ass as much as he comes through. This guy is a real blowhard. He's a lot of hot air, very self-assured, a screw-up". Furthermore, the actor felt that "at heart he thinks he's Indiana Jones but the circumstances are always too much for him". Russell felt that the film would be a hard one to market. "This is a difficult picture to sell because it's hard to explain. It's a mixture of the real history of Chinatown in San Francisco blended with Chinese legend and lore. It's bizarre stuff. There are only a handful of non-Asian actors in the cast".

John Carpenter had seen Dennis Dun in Year of the Dragon and liked his work in that film. He met the actor twice before casting him in the role of Wang Chi only a few days before principal photography. The martial arts sequences were not hard for Dun who had "dabbled" in training as a kid and done Chinese opera as an adult. He was drawn to the portrayal of Asian characters in the movie as he said, "I’m seeing Chinese actors getting to do stuff that American movies usually don’t let them do. I’ve never seen this type of role for an Asian in an American film". Jackie Chan was at one point considered for the role of Wang Chi but decided after the box office disasters of The Big Brawl and The Protector he should put more time and effort into his career in Hong Kong's film industry with Police Story instead.

The studio pressured Carpenter to cast a rock star in the role of Gracie Law, Jack Burton's love interest, but Carpenter wanted Kim Cattrall. The studio was not keen on the idea because at the time Cattrall was primarily known for raunchy comedies like Porky's and Police Academy. She was drawn to the film because of the way her character was portrayed. "I'm not screaming for help the whole time. I think the humor comes out of the situations and my relationship with Jack Burton. I’m the brains and he's the brawn".

Principal photography
Kurt Russell lifted weights and began running two months before production began to prepare for the physical demands of principal photography. In addition, Carpenter and his cast and crew did a week's rehearsals that mainly involved choreographing the martial arts scenes. 20th Century Fox was afraid that the production would create major overruns and hired Carpenter to direct because he could work fast. He was given only 10 weeks of pre-production.

Problems began to arise when Carpenter learned that the next Eddie Murphy vehicle, The Golden Child, featured a similar theme and was going to be released around the same time as Big Trouble in Little China. (As it happened, Carpenter was asked by Paramount Pictures to direct The Golden Child.) He remarked in an interview, "How many adventure pictures dealing with Chinese mysticism have been released by the major studios in the past 20 years? For two of them to come along at the exact same time is more than mere coincidence," To beat the rival production at being released in theaters, Big Trouble went into production in October 1985 so it could open in July 1986, five months before The Golden Childs Christmas release.

Although the early exterior establishing scenes were filmed on location in Chinatown, most of the film was shot on sets built in the Fox lot in Los Angeles. Production designer John Lloyd designed the elaborate underground sets and recreated Chinatown with three-story buildings, roads, streetlights, sewers and so on. This was necessary for the staging of complicated special effects and kung fu fight sequences that would have been very hard to do on location. This forced the filmmaker to shoot the film in 15 weeks with a $25 million budget. For the film's many fight scenes Carpenter worked with martial arts choreographer James Lew, who planned out every move in advance. Says Carpenter, "I used every cheap gag – trampolines, wires, reverse movements and upside-down sets. It was much like photographing a dance."

Carpenter envisioned the film as an inverse of traditional scenarios in action films with a Caucasian protagonist helped by a minority sidekick. In Big Trouble in Little China, Jack Burton, despite his bravado, is constantly portrayed as rather bumbling; in one fight sequence, he knocks himself unconscious before the fight begins. Wang Chi, on the other hand, is constantly portrayed as highly skilled and competent. On a commentary track for the DVD release, Carpenter said the film is really about a sidekick (Burton) who thinks he is a leading man. According to Carpenter, the studio "didn't get it" and made him write something that would explain the character of Jack Burton. Carpenter came up with the prologue scene between Egg Shen and the lawyer.

Visual effects
Carpenter was not entirely satisfied with Boss Film Studios, the company in charge of the film's visual effects. According to the director, they took on more projects than they could handle and some effects for the film had to be cut down. Richard Edlund, head of Boss Film Studios, said that there were no difficulties with the company's workload and that Big Trouble was probably its favorite film at the time, with the exception of Ghostbusters. The effects budget for the film was just under $2 million, which Edlund said was barely adequate. One of the more difficult effects was the floating eyeball, a spy for Lo-Pan. It was powered by several puppeteers and dozens of cables to control its facial expressions. It was shot with a special matting system specially designed for it.

Music

John Carpenter was nominated for a Saturn Award for Best Music for this film. With the soundtrack, Carpenter wanted to avoid the usual clichés, as he found that "other scores for American movies about Chinese characters are basically rinky tink, chop suey music. I didn’t want that for Big Trouble". Carpenter instead opted for his trademark synthesizer score mixed with rock 'n' roll music.

Reception

Box office
Opening in 1,053 theaters on July 2, 1986, Big Trouble in Little China grossed $2.7 million in its opening weekend and went on to gross $11.1 million in North America, well below its estimated budget of $19–25 million. The film was released in the midst of the hype for James Cameron's blockbuster Aliens, which was released 16 days after. On the DVD commentary for Big Trouble in Little China, Carpenter and Russell discuss this among possible reasons for the film's disappointing box office gross.

Critical response
On review aggregator Rotten Tomatoes, the film has an approval rating of 74% based on 65 reviews, with an average rating of 6.4/10. The site's consensus reads: "Brimming with energy and packed with humor, Big Trouble in Little China distills kung fu B-movies as affectionately as it subverts them." On Metacritic it has a score of 53% based on reviews from 15 critics, indicating "mixed or average reviews". Audiences surveyed by CinemaScore gave the film a grade "B+" on scale of A to F.

Ron Base, in his review for the Toronto Star, praised Russell's performance. "He does a great John Wayne imitation. But he's not just mimicking these heroes, he is using them to give his own character a broad, satiric edge." Walter Goodman in The New York Times wrote, "In kidding the flavorsome proceedings even as he gets the juice out of them, the director, John Carpenter, is conspicuously with it." Writer Harlan Ellison, widely known in Hollywood for his brutally honest critiques, praised the film, writing that it had "some of the funniest lines spoken by any actor this year to produce a cheerfully blathering live-action cartoon that will give you release from the real pressures of your basically dreary lives." In his review for Time, Richard Corliss wrote, "Little China offers dollops of entertainment, but it is so stocked with canny references to other pictures that it suggests a master's thesis that moves."

However, in his review for the Chicago Sun-Times, Roger Ebert wrote, "special effects don't mean much unless we care about the characters who are surrounded by them, and in this movie the characters often seem to exist only to fill up the foregrounds," and felt that it was "straight out of the era of Charlie Chan and Fu Manchu, with no apologies and all of the usual stereotypes." Paul Attanasio, in The Washington Post, criticized the screenwriters for being "much better at introducing a character than they are at developing one". David Ansen wrote, in his review for Newsweek, "though it is action packed, spectacularly edited and often quite funny, one can't help feeling that Carpenter is squeezing the last drops out of a fatigued genre." In his review for The Times, David Robinson felt that Carpenter was "overwhelmed by his own special effects, without a strong enough script to guide him."

Alex Stewart reviewed Big Trouble in Little China for White Dwarf No. 83, and stated that the film was "Amiable nonsense, delivered with panache by fearsome demons and flying swordsmen; and the jokes work. Wayne Crawford should take notes."

After the commercial and critical failure of the film, Carpenter became very disillusioned with Hollywood and became an independent filmmaker. He said in an interview, "The experience [of Big Trouble] was the reason I stopped making movies for the Hollywood studios. I won't work for them again. I think Big Trouble is a wonderful film, and I'm very proud of it. But the reception it received, and the reasons for that reception, were too much for me to deal with. I'm too old for that sort of bullshit."

It has since enjoyed a resurgence on television and home video, and has received a good deal of retroactive positive press. Some critics and fans considered it one of Carpenter’s best movies. Empire magazine voted Big Trouble in Little China the 430th greatest film in their "500 Greatest Movies of All Time" list.

Home media
Big Trouble in Little China was released on a two-disc special edition DVD set on May 22, 2001. Entertainment Weekly gave the DVD a "B+" rating and wrote, "The highlight of this two disc set – which also features deleted scenes, an extended ending, trailers, and a 1986 featurette – is the pitch perfect Russell and Carpenter commentary, which delves into Fox's marketing mishaps, Chinese history, and how Russell's son did in his hockey game." In his review for the Onion A.V. Club, Noel Murray wrote, "If nothing else, this is a DVD designed for Big Trouble cultists; it's packed with articles from Cinefex and American Cinematographer that only a genre geek would appreciate."

A single-disc movie-only DVD version was later released, with the only special features being the Carpenter/Russell commentary and the theatrical trailer.

A Blu-ray Disc edition of the film was released on August 4, 2009. It contains the same content as the double-disc DVD release. In 2013, the film was released on Blu-ray Disc in the United Kingdom by Arrow Films as a regular case and Steelbook.

On December 3, 2019, Scream Factory released a two-disc "Collector's Edition" Blu-ray of the film in the U.S., which included a bevy of new bonus features.

Other media

Sequel
In June 2015, TheWrap reported that Dwayne Johnson was developing a remake to star as Jack Burton and produce with his Seven Bucks Productions film studio. Ashley Miller and Zack Stentz were hired screenwriters. In an interview with Entertainment Weekly, Johnson expressed interest in having Carpenter involved in the film. Carpenter responded stating, "It's very early in the process. I haven't spoken to Dwayne Johnson about any of this... I'm ambivalent about a remake."

By August 27, 2018, Seven Bucks Productions' President Hiram Garcia clarified that the film will be a sequel and a continuation of the previous film. The creative minds behind the new film acknowledged that they have no intention of replacing Kurt Russell by re-casting Johnson as Jack Burton, but will make a follow-up movie to the original.

Video game
A tie-in video game of the same name was published in 1986 by Electric Dreams Software for the ZX Spectrum, Commodore 64 and Amstrad CPC. Critical reception was mixed.

Comic book series
On February 27, 2014, Boom! Studios announced they were working on a comic book series. The comic book is written by Eric Powell and John Carpenter with artwork by Brian Churilla. The series began in June 2014.

Boom! released a crossover limited series between Jack Burton and Snake Plissken titled Big Trouble in Little China/Escape from New York in October 2016.

A previously projected comic book series previewed by Top Cow Productions at the 2009 San Diego Comic-Con failed to appear.

On June 14, 2017, Boom! announced a new four-issue limited series, to be published in September 2017, called Big Trouble in Little China: Old Man Jack, written by Carpenter and Anthony Burch, with art by Jorge Corona. Taking place in 2020, Jack Burton comes out of retirement to battle Ching Dai and save the world.

Vinyl figures
In February 2015, Funko released a line of ReAction and Pop! vinyl figures based on Big Trouble in Little China.

Board game
On July 15, 2016, Boom! Studios announced a partnership with Everything Epic and Flipside to create a board game based on the film. It was released in 2018, and is a highly thematic cooperative miniatures board game for 1–4 players.

Card game
In August 2016, Upper Deck released the Legendary: Big Trouble in Little China deck-building card game. It is a semi-cooperative game for 2–5 players using the deck-building mechanic in which players purchase cards from a central pool to work together against the "villain" deck. The cards feature original artwork based on characters from the movie. It comes with 400 cards and a special playmat, and retails for around $40.

Influence

Marvel supervillain The Mandarin in the 1990s Iron Man comic run by John Byrne and John Romita Jr. was modeled in appearance after Lo Pan.

The film's portrayal of the lightning sorcerer/demigod character has been occasionally described as an inspiration for the character of Raiden from Mortal Kombat, introducing the archetype of a straw hat–wearing monk able to control lightning with his hands to Western audiences. (In traditional Chinese and Japanese culture, the lightning god is represented more akin to a traditional Asian creature.) Additionally, the character David Lo Pan has been credited as the original inspiration for the soul-stealing Mortal Kombat villain Shang Tsung.

The twenty-third episode of the second season of the 2012 Teenage Mutant Ninja Turtles TV series, called "A Chinatown Ghost Story", uses concepts from the film, but renames the antagonist Lo Pan to Ho Chan, and the Storm figure Rain is replaced by Wind. In addition, James Hong (Lo Pan) reprises his Little China performance as the principal villain character.

The song "We Have Candy" by the South African rap-rave group Die Antwoord features lead singer Ninja reciting some of Jack Burton's dialogue from the film.

In 2006, American experimental rock band Man Man released an album with the title Six Demon Bag, which is a reference to a line in the film.

A 2012 parody music video of the song "Gangnam Style" was entitled Lo Pan Style  and featured the storyline and characters from the movie, including a cameo by James Hong.

New Zealand director Taika Waititi cited the film as an influence on Thor: Ragnarok (2017).

The Regular Show Season 3 episode "Fortune Cookie" The villain is The Warlock who has a Resemblance to Lo Pan. In fact, the character was played by James Hong who played the same character.

The season 2 episode of Rick and Morty Titled "Big Trouble in Little Sanchez" is a reference title of the movie.

The Ninety-seven episode of Randy Cunningham: 9th Grade Ninja episode Titled "Big Trouble in Little Norrisville" The episode has a place name Little Norrisville and the Shopkeeper also played by James Hong who played Lo Pan.

The American hard rock band Lo-Pan is named after Hong's character in the movie.

See also
 List of cult films
 List of martial arts films

References

External links

 
 
 
 Big Trouble in Little China at John Carpenter's official website
 The Wing Kong Exchange'' discussion of film influence.
 Erasing Clouds retrospective article

1986 films
1980s action comedy films
1980s fantasy comedy films
1986 martial arts films
American action comedy films
Action films about Asian Americans
1986 fantasy films
Films about Chinese Americans
American fantasy comedy films
American martial arts films
1980s English-language films
Kung fu films
Chinatown, San Francisco in fiction
Films set in Los Angeles
Films set in San Francisco
Films shot in Los Angeles
Films shot in San Francisco
Martial arts fantasy films
Trucker films
20th Century Fox films
Puppet films
Films directed by John Carpenter
Films scored by John Carpenter
Films scored by Alan Howarth (composer)
Films with screenplays by W. D. Richter
Films about curses
Films about wizards
Films adapted into comics
1986 comedy films
Films with screenplays by Gary Goldman (screenwriter)
1980s American films